Samuel Wells (August 15, 1801 – July 15, 1868) was an American politician and the 25th Governor of Maine.

Biography
Samuel Wells was born in Durham, New Hampshire on August 15, 1801. He was educated at local schools, studied law, and was admitted to the bar.

Wells had a successful career as an attorney in Maine, living successively in Waterville, Hallowell, and Portland.  He served in the Maine House of Representatives from 1836 to 1840.  Wells was an associate justice of the Maine Supreme Judicial Court from 1847 to 1854.

A Democrat, Wells became Governor of Maine in 1856, chosen by the state legislature after none of the candidates in a three-way race obtained the popular vote majority required by law.

He was unsuccessful in his re-election bid and left office on January 8, 1857. After leaving office, he moved to Boston and practiced law.

He died in Boston on July 15, 1868.  Wells was buried at Evergreen Cemetery in Portland.

Sources

External links
 Sobel, Robert and John Raimo. Biographical Directory of the Governors of the United States, 1789-1978. Greenwood Press, 1988. 
 Samuel Wells at National Governors Association

1801 births
1868 deaths
Democratic Party governors of Maine
Democratic Party members of the Maine House of Representatives
People from Hallowell, Maine
People from Durham, New Hampshire
19th-century American politicians
Justices of the Maine Supreme Judicial Court
Maine lawyers
Lawyers from Boston
19th-century American lawyers
19th-century American judges